Michael Mason may refer to:

Michael Mason (cricketer) (born 1974), New Zealand cricketer
Michael Mason (high jumper) (born 1986), Canadian high jumper
Michael Mason (soccer) (born 1971), American-German soccer player
Michael Mason (swimmer) (born 1974), American swimmer
Michael Atwood Mason (born 1966), American folklorist and museum professional
Michael Paul Mason (born 1971), American author and journalist
Mike Mason (baseball) (born 1958), retired Major League Baseball player